Marbodus, Marbod or Marbode of Rennes ( 1035 – 11 September 1123) was archdeacon and schoolmaster at Angers, France, then Bishop of Rennes in Brittany. He was a respected poet, hagiographer, and hymnologist.

Biography
Marbod was born near Angers in Anjou, France, presumably in the mid-1030s. He received at least part of his early education at Angers under archdeacon and schoolmaster Rainaldus (d. c. 1076), who may have been trained by Fulbert of Chartres. He was a well-known and highly praised scholar in Angers. Marbod had three known named relatives: a brother named Hugo, who was a canon of Saint-Maurice of Angers, a mother most likely named Hildeburgis, and a nephew named Herveus.

Two of Marbod's family members were in the entourage of Count Fulk le Réchin of Anjou.  The power of the episcopate in Northern France during the twelfth century was immense. The position came with land, economic, political, and spiritual power which had been continued on from the time of Carolingian kings. For noblemen, having a bishop on one's side could lend to having a lot of pull in politics. Count Fulk negotiated Marbod’s position as bishop because he was acquainted with Marbod's family and therefore someone who he could influence the power of with more ease.  Marbod was a canon in the cathedral chapter of Saint-Maurice of Angers as early as c. 1068. In about 1076 he became the cardinal archdeacon of Angers as well as the master of its cathedral school. He was consecrated in his mid-60s as bishop of Rennes by Pope Urban II (1088–1099) during the Council of Tours (16–23 March 1096) while he was touring France to promote his crusade. Marbod succeeded Silvester of La Guerche (1076-93) as bishop. Although Pope Urban II was a reforming pope in the tradition of Pope Gregory VII (1073–1085) (see Gregorian Reform), it is likely that Marbod's selection as bishop had a significant political component. Pope Urban II's goals were to promote his crusade and have the church gain more freedom and separation, and therefore power, from the secular world. Bishop Marbod attempted to implement reform principles in his diocese of Rennes, working to regain episcopal possessions that had been alienated by his predecessor-bishops, and helping transfer churches held by laymen to ecclesiastical hands. With these actions, he aided in the continuation of Gregorian Reform through aiding the acquisition of land for the church. He was critical of the more extreme practices of Robert of Arbrissel and other such itinerant preachers wandering northwestern France at the time, but his letters indicate that he was tolerant of and even favorable towards their religious ideals.

At the age of about eighty-eight he resigned his diocese and withdrew to the Benedictine monastery of St. Aubin at Angers where he died.

Writings
Marbod was renowned for his Latin writing during his lifetime. Sigebert of Gembloux, writing c. 1110–1125, praised Marbod's clever verse style. He composed works in verse and prose on both sacred and secular subjects: saints' lives, examples of rhetorical figures (De ornamentis verborum), a work of Christian advice (Liber decem capitulorum) hymns, lyric poetry on many subjects, and at least six prose letters.

His style of poetry was part of a group of poets that were from French Cathedral Schools. Their poetry was marked by its revival of the classical style, writing in Latin and specific verse. He commonly wrote in Leonine hexameter. A poem written this way would consist of six metrical feet per line. This style of verse was popular in the Middle Ages and was distinguishable from verse in antiquity by its use of rhyme within the feet of the poem. Marbod's subject matter was diverse, dealing with both secular and religious topics. He wrote mainly didactic poetry; poetry that gave instruction or lessons to its readers.

The most popular of Marbod's works was the Liber de lapidibus, a verse lapidary or compendium of mythological gem-lore; by the fourteenth century it had been translated into French, Provençal, Italian, Irish, and Danish, and it was the first of Marbod's works to be printed.

The first collection of Marbod's works was published at Rennes in 1524 (In collectione prima operum Marbodi). Today the most widely accessible edition of Marbod's collected works is that in Migne's Patrologiae cursus completus Series Latina, vol. 171, edited by Jean-Jacques Bourassé (Paris, 1854); this was based on the edition of Antoine Beaugendre, Venerabilis Hildeberti primo Cenomannensis Accesserunt Marbodi Redonensis (Paris, 1708). Both contain numerous errors and omissions and should be used with caution. Modern editions of Marbod's works include Antonella Degl’Innocenti, ed. Marbodo di Rennes: Vita beati Roberti (Florence, 1995) and Maria Esthera Herrera, ed., Marbodo de Rennes Lapidario (Liber lapidum) (Paris, 2005).

Marbod produced lyric poetry on a wide variety of subjects, including frankly erotic love lyrics concerning male and female love interests. Many of his shorter poems circulated primarily in florilegia, collections assembled for the use of students. The most radical of Marbod's poems, while printed in the earliest collections, were omitted by Beaugendre and Bourassé; they were reprinted by Walther Bulst in "Liebesbriefgedichte Marbods," in Liber floridus: Mittellateinische Studien Paul Lehmann, zum 65 Geburtstaag am 13. Juli 1949, ed. Bernhard Bischoff and Suso Brechter (St. Ottilien, 1950), p. 287–301, and Lateinisches Mittelalter: Gesammelte Beitraege (Heidelberg, 1984), 182–196.

Homosexuality 
Several of his poems speak of handsome boys and homosexual desires but reject physical relationships (An Argument Against Copulation Between People of Only One Sex). This exemplifies a tradition of medieval poetry which celebrated same-sex friendship while denouncing the wickedness of sexual relations. There was an increasing rejection of desire, specifically desires of the body, with the rise of asceticism during the Middle Ages within clerical communities as well as the general populous in Europe. This accounted for the disapproval of homosexual relationships; homosexuality went against newly forming categories of the sacredness of the flesh and distinct categories of male and female.    Marbod is writing in the context of constructions of twelfth century French constructions of gender and sexuality. While distinctions between the male and female sex existed, sexuality was also strongly defined by power dynamics; it mattered if one had the ability to express one's sexual desires, whether physically or through text. Marbod had the power to write about it.

It is evident in other French didactic writing, such as that from Robert de Blois, that sexuality was largely paradoxical. Writers argued against sexualizing a person while simultaneously describing them in a sexual manor. It is feasible that Marbod both accepted and rejected homosexuality simultaneously, having a persona in his poetry that experienced same sex desire that operated under the Christian framework he lived in. This was not an uncommon stance to take as didactic poets of the Middle Ages often argued against what they believed in in order to demonstrate their argument skills.

There is no direct evidence that Marbod participated in homosexual acts. However, some of his poems, such as the one where he sent an urgent demand that his beloved return if he wished the speaker to remain faithful to him, have nonetheless been interpreted to indicate that more than poetic invention was involved. His friendships with Baudry of Bourgeuil, his junior, and Hildebart of Lavardin suggest this as well. Marbod dedicated much of his later works to Hildebart. All three of the men authored poems expressing homosexual desire, both lording it and denouncing it. The poetry these men were writing expressing homosexual acts reflected other communities of poets in Europe. Jewish communities in Spain similarly wrote about the beauty and allure of young men. The similarities in these communities of men writing about homosexuality implies a larger subculture of Medieval homosexuality outside of individual men.

Translations and adaptations

 A French translation of his hymns was edited by Ropartz (Rennes, 1873).
 Marbod's verse life of Saint Thaïs, a fourth-century Egyptian prostitute who finished her life as a recluse, inspired the novel by Anatole France and in turn the opera by Jules Massenet.

Further reading 

 Antonella Degl'Innocenti, L’opera agiografica di Marbodo de Rennes (Spoleto, 1990)
 Rosario Leotta, and Carmelo Crimi, eds., De ornamentis verborum; Liber decem capitulorum: retorica, mitologia e moralità di un vescovo poeta, secc. XI–XII (Florence, 1998)
 André Wilmart, "Le florilège de Saint-Gatien: contribution à l’étude des poèmes d’Hildebert et de Marbode", Revue bénédictine 48(1936):3–40; 145–181; 245–258
 Herbermann, Charles, ed. (1913). "Marbodius". Catholic Encyclopedia. New York: Robert Appleton Company.

Notes

Sources
 
 

1030s births
1123 deaths
Breton bishops
Bishops of Rennes
11th-century French Roman Catholic bishops
12th-century French Roman Catholic bishops
LGBT history in France
Medieval LGBT history
11th-century French poets
Medieval Latin poets
12th-century French poets
11th-century French writers
12th-century French writers
11th-century Latin writers
12th-century Latin writers